Mark Andrew Crawley (born 16 December 1967) is a former English cricketer. Crawley was a right-handed batsman who bowled right-arm medium. He was born in Newton-le-Willows, Lancashire.

Early career
Crawley made his first-class debut for Oxford University against Kent in 1987. From 1987 to 1990, he represented the University in 24 first-class matches, the last of which came against Cambridge University. During his 4 seasons with the University, he scored 1,189 runs at a batting average of 44.03, with 8 half centuries, 3 centuries and a high score of 140. In the field he took 17 catches. With the ball he claimed 24 wickets at a bowling average of 62.29, with a single five wicket haul which gave him best figures of 6/92. While playing for the University, Crawley also made a single first-class appearance for a combined Oxford and Cambridge Universities team against the touring New Zealanders in 1990.

In 1987, he made his debut in List A cricket for a Combined Universities team against Somerset in the 1987 Benson and Hedges Cup. From 1987 to 1990, he represented the Combined Universities in 13 List A matches, the last of which came against Hampshire in the 1990 Benson and Hedges Cup.

County career
In 1990, Crawley made a single first-class appearance for Lancashire against the touring Sri Lankans.

The following season he joined Nottinghamshire, making his first-class debut for the county against Oxford University. From 1991 to 1994, he represented the county in 54 first-class matches, the last of which came against Somerset in the 1994 County Championship. In his 54 first-class matches for the county, he scored 2,047 runs at an average of 28.04, with 6 half centuries, 5 centuries and a high score of 160*. In the field he took 50 catches, while with the ball he took 37 wickets at an average of 38.18, with best figures of 3/18.

During the same period from 1991 to 1994, Crawley played 63 List A matches for Nottinghamshire, the last of which came against Worcestershire in the 1994 AXA Equity and Law League. In his 63 matches for the county in that format, he scored 1,093 runs at an average of 26.02, with 4 half centuries and a high score of 94*. In the field he took 18 catches. With the ball he took 35 wickets at an average of 37.91, with best figures of 4/26.

In 1999, he made a single List A appearance for the Middlesex Cricket Board against Cumberland in the 1999 NatWest Trophy.

Family
His youngest brother, John, played Test and One Day International cricket for England. He also played first-class cricket for Lancashire, Cambridge University and Hampshire. His younger brother Peter also played first-class cricket for Cambridge University. He is now married to Natasha Crawley with three children, Lottie Crawley (a student at the University of Oxford), Sam Crawley (a student at Loughborough university and all round swell guy) and Francesca Crawley

References

External links

1967 births
Living people
People from Newton-le-Willows
Sportspeople from Lancashire
English cricketers
Oxford University cricketers
Lancashire cricketers
Nottinghamshire cricketers
Middlesex Cricket Board cricketers
Oxford and Cambridge Universities cricketers
Alumni of Oriel College, Oxford
British Universities cricketers